is a train station in Matsue, Shimane Prefecture, Japan. It is on the Kita-Matsue Line, operated by the Ichibata Electric Railway. Local services and the express service Izumotaisha stop at this station.

This station serves Matsue Vogel Park, an aviary park and greenhouse.

Lines
 Ichibata Electric Railway
 Kita-Matsue Line

Adjacent stations

|-
!colspan=5|Ichibata Electric Railway

References

Bataden Kita-Matsue Line
Railway stations in Shimane Prefecture
Railway stations in Japan opened in 2001